Heritage High School is a high school in Palm Bay, Florida run by Brevard Public Schools. It is the 16th school in the district.

History
The budget to construct the school was $80 million. Heritage High opened August 10, 2009, with 9th and 10th grade students. In 2010, 11th grade was added. In August 2011, the school officially  became a high school with 9-12 grade with its first Senior class  graduating in 2012. It drew students from Bayside High School, Palm Bay High School, and Melbourne High School.

Sports
Heritage teams compete in the Cape Coast Conference as the Panthers. The school colors are blue, black, and white.

Activities
Student activities include:
JROTC
Academy of Environmental Studies
Automotive Service Technology
Cambridge AICE
Sports Medicine Academy 
Band

Clubs
Anime club
Video game club
Feminist finger painting club
Girl up
Robotics
Math Club
Critical Race theory club
Year book club (YBC)
TSA
Spoken Word Poetry
Panther Pause 
Student Government Association
WPNN
Fellowship of Christian Athletes
LGBT drag & Transitioning club 
Reading Club
Future problem solvers
Gardening Club
Painting Club 
Puzzle club
Musical Literature
Drone club
E-Sports club

References

Palm Bay, Florida
Brevard Public Schools
High schools in Brevard County, Florida
Educational institutions established in 2009
Public high schools in Florida
2009 establishments in Florida